Márton Bene (born October 1, 1986) is an alpine skier from Hungary.  He competed for Hungary at the 2010 Winter Olympics.  His best result was a 71st place in the giant slalom.

References

External links

1986 births
Living people
Hungarian male alpine skiers
Olympic alpine skiers of Hungary
Alpine skiers at the 2010 Winter Olympics